Marc Toberoff is an intellectual property attorney specializing in copyright and entertainment litigation.

He is known for representing the estates of Superman's co-creators, Jerry Siegel and Joe Shuster, in ongoing litigation with Warner Bros. and DC Comics over the original copyrights to Superman. The lawsuit has become a seminal case regarding the Copyright Act's termination provisions, which permit authors and their estates to recover their copyrights after lengthy time periods. In 2008, Toberoff secured a favorable ruling in the U. S. District Court for the Central District of California. ("After seventy years, Jerome Siegel's heirs regain what he granted so long ago-the copyright in the Superman material that was published in Action Comics, Vol. 1."). In 2013, after a part of that decision was reversed on appeal, final judgment was entered upholding the heirs' termination as to Siegel and Shuster's original Superman story and other early works.

Toberoff also represents the estate of comic book artist and creator Jack Kirby in litigation with Marvel Entertainment regarding the copyrights to Kirby's co-creations, including Fantastic Four, X-Men, Incredible Hulk, Mighty Thor and Silver Surfer. A petition for certiorari to the U.S. Supreme Court is currently pending.

In the music industry, Toberoff represents, among others, the children of Ray Charles. On their behalf, Toberoff prevailed in a suit in the Central District of California regarding the copyrights to fifty-one of his songs, including many of his most famous compositions (e.g., I Got A Woman, It's All Right, Hallelujah I Love Her So). The case is on appeal. Toberoff also represents most of the children of James Brown regarding his copyrights.

Toberoff has been recognized by Forbes Magazine, The Hollywood Reporter, Variety, and the Los Angeles Business Journal as among the most influential intellectual property attorneys in the entertainment industry.

In 2008, Toberoff persuaded the Ninth Circuit to affirm the copyrights of the daughter of Eric Knight in his novel Lassie Come-Home, a case that has helped shape authors' rights under the Copyright Act. In 2005, Toberoff secured a preliminary injunction against the Warner Bros. release of its The Dukes of Hazzard movie on behalf of the owners of the indie film, Moonrunners, from which The Dukes of Hazzard television series was derived. Toberoff has also represented writers and other creators in the television industry.

References

External links 
Official website

Copyright attorneys
Year of birth missing (living people)
Living people